"Kinek mondjam el vétkeimet?" ("To whom shall I tell my sins?") is a song by Hungarian singer Friderika Bayer. Written and composed by Szilveszter Jenei, it represented  in the Eurovision Song Contest 1994 in Dublin. It marked Hungary's debut performance in the contest.

Background and release
The song was written and composed by Szilveszter Jenei. According to an interview with Bayer, Jenei had originally written the song for singer Sarolta Zalatnay, but it remained unreleased.

The single was released on 27 April 1994 by EMI-Quint and also featured the song's English-language version ("Who Will Be There"), along with the tracks "Születésnap" ("Birthday") and "Bádogszív" ("Tin heart"). The track was later included on Bayer's first studio album Friderika, released on 8 June 1994.

Eurovision Song Contest
Magyar Televízió, Hungary's public television organised the 1994 edition of Táncdalfesztivál, which served as the national selection show for the Eurovision Song Contest 1994. The final of the competition took place on 5 April. Bayer finished in first place and won the right to represent Hungary at Eurovision.

The Eurovision Song Contest took place at the Point Theatre in Dublin, Ireland, on 30 April 1994. At the contest, Bayer made her country's debut with "Kinek mondjam el vétkeimet?". She performed in 22nd place, preceded by Spain and followed by Russia. Hungary came in fourth position in a field of 25 with 122 points, which remains the country's best Eurosivion result.

Reception
In May 1994, Friderika Bayer and Szilveszter Jenei were presented with a special  by Magyar Rádió, Hungary's public radio, for their achievement in the Eurovision Song Contest.

Track listing

Covers and other versions
 recorded a version of the song for her 2010 studio album . The track features guitar work from Jenei. In October 2017, singer Zorán Sztevanovity covered "Kinek mondjam el vétkeimet?" to promote the third and final season of the HBO series . The cover version, produced by Geri Kovács and Ádám Balázs, includes slightly modified lyrics to match the atmosphere of the series. An accompanying "mood video" was also released, featuring scenes from the series and footage of the song's recording.

In December 2014, a special tribute album was issued for the 20th anniversary of the song's original release and Hungary's Eurovision debut.

References

Eurovision songs of Hungary
Eurovision songs of 1994
1994 songs
1994 singles